Ishtup-Ilum, also Ishtup-El (Ish-dub-ilum, c. 2147–2136 BCE) was a ruler of the city of Mari, one of the military governors known as Shakkanakku in northern Mesopotamia, after the fall of the Akkadian Empire. He was probably contemporary with the Second Dynasty of Lagash, around the time of Gudea. He was the son of Ishma-Dagan and brother of Nûr-Mêr, both Shakkanakkus of Mari before him, and, according to the dynastic lists, he ruled after them for a period of 11 years. 

He is known from inscriptions mentioning the building of a temple, as well as from a monumental statue, discovered in Mari.

Statue of Ishtup-Ilum
His statue was discovered by the team of André Parrot on 14 March 1936, Syria. It has a rather simple and coarse design, a provincial characteristic during this period, and is significantly less sophisticated than the statues of his successors, such as Puzur-Ishtar. The statue is now in the Aleppo National Museum, Syria.

Dedication tablets
Ishtup-Ilum is also known from a dedication tablet for the "Temple of the King of the Country" (either Dagan or Enlil) with the inscription: 

This implies that Ishtup-Ilum was the builder of this "Temple of the King of the Country", in which were also discovered beautiful copper statues of guardian lions, the "Lions of Mari", probably installed later during a rebuilding of the temple in the early 2nd millennium BCE. The Temple was excavated in 1938 by André Parrot.

References

22nd-century BC rulers
Kings of Mari
22nd-century BC people